Ville-Joonas Peltola (born February 16, 1985) is a Finnish former professional ice hockey player. He played with one game with Ilves of the SM-liiga during the 2010-11 season.

References

External links

1985 births
Finnish ice hockey defencemen
Ilves players
KOOVEE players
Lempäälän Kisa players
Living people